Bernardino Rocci (1627–1680) was a Roman Catholic cardinal.

On 22 April 1668, he was consecrated bishop by Giulio Gabrielli, Cardinal-Bishop of Sabina, with Emilio Bonaventura Altieri, Bishop Emeritus of Camerino, and Carlo de' Vecchi, Titular Archbishop of Athenae, serving as co-consecrators.

References

1627 births
1680 deaths
17th-century Italian cardinals
Clergy from Rome